Ingrow (East) railway station was a small English railway station on the Keighley-Queensbury section of the Queensbury Lines which ran between Bradford, Halifax and Keighley via Queensbury. The station served the prosperous industrial district of Keighley and was only a short distance away from the Ingrow (West) railway station on the Midland Railway Oxenhope Branch, which is now the preserved Keighley and Worth Valley Railway.

To cope with the production from the mills the station had a vast goods yard. The whole station and goods yard site has now been incorporated into the Travis Perkins builders merchants which occupies the site. Just beyond the station was the GN Goods Junction where the GN trains linked with the Oxenhope branch for the last mile into Keighley. Beyond the junction the line continued alongside the Oxenhope Branch before diverging beneath it into the GN goods yard, where, unlike the MR goods yard, all the buildings are intact.

In 1957, two years after closure to passengers, the station area was used in a test on a new type of railway sleeper. British Rail deliberately derailed a driverless locomotive for the test. Press and public alike were not allowed to witness or photograph the event.

References

External links
 Ingrow (East) station (the station on the right of the pair) on navigable 1947 OS map

Disused railway stations in Bradford
Former Great Northern Railway stations
Railway stations in Great Britain opened in 1884
Railway stations in Great Britain closed in 1955
1884 establishments in England
1955 disestablishments in England